Alberto López Dávila (born 18 February 1963) is a Guatemalan sprinter. He competed in the men's 400 metres at the 1984 Summer Olympics.

References

1963 births
Living people
Athletes (track and field) at the 1984 Summer Olympics
Guatemalan male sprinters
Guatemalan male middle-distance runners
Olympic athletes of Guatemala
Place of birth missing (living people)